Soul of a Woman may refer to:
 Soul of a Woman (Kelly Price album), a 1998 album by Kelly Price
 Soul of a Woman (Sharon Jones & the Dap-Kings album), a 2017 album by Sharon Jones & the Dap-Kings

See also
 Soul of a Man (disambiguation)